Alanthus Grove is an unincorporated community in northwest Gentry County, in the U.S. state of Missouri.

The community is on Missouri Route B approximately six miles north of Stanberry. The Grand River flows past one-half mile to the east.

History
A post office called Alanthus Grove was established in 1855, and remained in operation until 1906. The community most likely was named for a grove of ailanthus trees near the original town site.

In 1925, Alanthus Grove had 104 inhabitants.

References

Unincorporated communities in Gentry County, Missouri
Unincorporated communities in Missouri